Takadomari Dam  is a gravity dam located in Hokkaido Prefecture in Japan. The dam is used for irrigation and power production. The catchment area of the dam is 800 km2. The dam impounds about 137  ha of land when full and can store 21518 thousand cubic meters of water. The construction of the dam was started on 1949 and completed in 1953.

References

Dams in Hokkaido